The Maryland State Athletic Hall of Fame is an athletics hall of fame in the U.S. state of Maryland. The Hall was founded in 1956 to honor Marylanders for their accomplishments in sports.

References

Sports in Maryland
Track and field in Maryland
Halls of fame in Maryland
State sports halls of fame in the United States
Awards established in 1956